TKF can stand for:

Telecommunications Union, former Danish trade union
Turkish Communist Party (official), political party briefly active from 1920